Santosh Srinivas Rowthu is an Indian director, screenwriter, and cinematographer who works in Telugu cinema. He directed Kandireega which featured Ram Pothineni in lead role.

Early life and career

Santosh was born and brought up in Visakhapatnam. He completed his schooling and graduation in Visakhapatnam.

He started his career as a cinematographer. He worked as cinematographer for films that include Khatarnak, Takkari, Rainbow. he made his directorial debut in 2012 with Kandireega starring Ram Pothineni and Hansika Motwani. Later he started Rabhasa featuring N. T. Rama Rao Jr and Samantha Ruth Prabhu in lead roles.

Filmography

References

External links

Living people
21st-century Indian film directors
Telugu film directors
Film directors from Andhra Pradesh
Artists from Visakhapatnam
1980 births